Haxthausen is a surname. Notable people by that name include:

 Holger Haxthausen (1892-1959), professor of dermatology.
 August von Haxthausen (1792-1866), nobleman.
 Frederik Gottschalk von Haxthausen (1750–1825), Norwegian politician.
 Aurore von Haxthausen (1830-88), artist.